The 2022 Wimbledon championships, a Grand Slam tennis tournament, featured a mixed invitational doubles event for the first time.

Nenad Zimonjić and Marion Bartoli won the title, defeating Todd Woodbridge and Cara Black in the final, 7–6(7–1), 6–1.

Format
Sixteen former professional tennis players, eight men and eight women competed, forming eight mixed pairs distributed in two round-robin groups. Following the round robin phase, the two group winners face each other in the final.

Draw

Final

Group A

Group B

References
Mixed Invitation Doubles

Mixed Invitation Doubles